Mdina Knights F.C. is an association football club representing Malta's former capital city, Mdina, currently playing in the Maltese National Amateur League B. The club is the smallest club in Malta and represents a town of approximately 250 residents. They also play in the annual Maltese FA Trophy.

Executive committee

Technical Staff

Head Coach: Roland Sollars 

Assistant Coach: Ray Formosa

Team Manager: Marco Buttigieg 

Kit Manager: Joe Muscat

References

External links
Mdina Knights official website
Sassco.co.uk Malta Tour containing a video of their game v Mdina Knights on Day 2

Association football clubs established in 2006
Football clubs in Malta
Mdina
2006 establishments in Malta